Saurus may refer to:

 Sarus (Goth), sometimes spelled as "Saurus", a Gothic chieftain and a commander of Emperor Honorius of the Western Roman Empire.
 Saurus (company), a Japanese arcade game developer; see list of Saurus games
 "-saurus", a common suffix for reptiles in taxonomy
 Saurus, a  genus of lizardfishes.

Vehicles 
 Nissan Saurus, a concept car by Nissan Motors
 Nissan Saurus Jr., the race car version of Nissan Saurus first sold in 1991

See also 

 The saurus